Stratford High School is a high school in Stratford, Connecticut, USA. Stratford High serves students in grades 9 - 12. It is part of Stratford Public Schools and is accredited by the New England Association of Schools and Colleges and the Connecticut State Department of Education.

Notable alumni

Tom Penders (1964), collegiate basketball coach
Ken Olsen (1944), cofounder of Digital Equipment Corporation (DEC) in 1957
Ed Bradley (1968), professional football player
Nick Giaquinto (1973), professional football player
 Patricia McCoy, Minority Leader in the Vermont House of Representatives
Victoria Leigh Soto (2003), Sandy Hook Elementary School teacher, died while trying to protect her students during a massacre on December 14, 2012.

References

External links

Public high schools in Connecticut
Schools in Fairfield County, Connecticut
Buildings and structures in Stratford, Connecticut